Silene species are used as food plants by the larvae of some Lepidoptera species including:

Monophagous species which feed exclusively on Silene

Coleophora case-bearers:
C. apicialbella
C. nutantella
C. otitae
C. silenella

Polyphagous species which feed on Silene among other plants

Coleophora case-bearers:
C. corsicella (recorded on S. nutans)
C. leucapennella
C. lithargyrinella (recorded on S. vulgaris)
Cabbage moth, Mamestra brassicae
Grey chi, Antitype chi
Lime-speck pug, Eupithecia centaureata
Lychnis, Hadena bicruris
Shark, Cucullia umbratica

External links

Silene
+Lepidoptera